Nguyễn Văn Toàn (October 6, 1932 – October 19, 2005) was born in Huế and served as a general in the Army of the Republic of Vietnam (ARVN).

Military education

Toan graduated from the Dalat Military Academy in 1952 and became an armor officer.

Military assignments
   Lieutenant General, III Corps Commander.
   Armor Commander.
   II Corps Commander.
   Major General, Armor Commander.
   Brigadier General, 2nd Infantry Division Commander.
   Colonel, 1st Infantry Division Deputy Commander.
   Lieutenant Colonel, 5th Armor Squadron.
   Major, Superintendent of Armor School.
   Captain, Armor Battalion Deputy Commander - Commander.
   Lieutenant, Armor Company X.O.
   First Lieutenant, Armor Platoon Leader.
   Cadet, 3-5 Class of Dalat Military Academy.

Military campaigns
Toan was relieved of command of the 5th Armored Squadron when his retreating armored elements killed over two dozen South Vietnamese Rangers. He returned to political favor when the officer that relieved him, General Nguyen Chanh Thi, was exiled for his unpopular political views. From 1968 to 1972, Toan served as a brigadier general commanding of the 2nd Infantry Division. During this period he was reportedly to have made a fortune dealing in black market cinnamon taken from his division's area of operations, earning him the nickname The Cinnamon General. Through the patronage of Nguyễn Cao Kỳ he was promoted to lieutenant general and became assistant operations officer and armor commander in I Corps.

During the initial phases of the North Vietnamese Easter Offensive in March 1972, Toan performed well, especially in the defense of Dong Ha, but he fell under the same cloud as his commander, Lieutenant General Hoang Xuan Lam, when the ARVN defense in I Corps collapsed. It was at this point that Toan's political connections again became paramount when he was moved south on 10 May to take command of II Corps after the physical and emotional collapse of General Ngo Dzu. He took command at a point when the Central Highlands had become the second front of the offensive. Fortunately for Toan, his senior U.S. advisor, John Paul Vann was fighting the battle for him. When the conflict settled down to a struggle for the city of Kontum, Toan cleverly attended to administrative matters and left operational control in the hands of Vann and Ly Tong Ba, commander of the 23rd Division.

Toan notorious for his corruption, remained in the command of II Corps until 1974 when he was relieved of command by President Nguyen Van Thieu during an anti-corruption campaign. 

During the North Vietnamese Ho Chi Minh Campaign of 1975, Toan was given command of III Corps. It was as commander of the Saigon redoubt during the final battles of the war that Toan faced his greatest challenge. Despite the courage of the 18th Division troops to prevent the Communist forces from entering to the capital, the troops were swamped by vastly larger forces. Recognizing the situation could not be reversed, Toan escaped from South Vietnam after deceiving Generals Le Minh Dao and Tran Quang Khoi that he would fly to the General Command Headquarters in Saigon to request for more troops. Toan is believed to have carried out the order of President Thieu to assassinate his Deputy Corps Commander General Nguyen Van Hieu on April 8, 1975.

References

 Andrade, Dale. Trial by Fire: The 1972 Easter Offensive, America's Last Vietnam Battle. New York: Hippocrene Books, 1993.
 Vien, General Cao Van, The Final Collapse. Washington DC: United States Army Center of Military History, 1983.

External links
Lieutenant General Nguyễn Văn Toàn's military resume

1932 births
2005 deaths
Army of the Republic of Vietnam generals
Recipients of the National Order of Vietnam
Recipients of the Silver Star
Recipients of the Gallantry Cross (Vietnam)
South Vietnamese military personnel of the Vietnam War
Vietnamese military personnel
Vietnamese anti-communists